Tacettin Öztürkmen (born 3 November 1913, date of death unknown) was a Turkish cyclist. He competed in the team pursuit event at the 1928 Summer Olympics.

References

External links
 

1913 births
Year of death missing
Turkish male cyclists
Olympic cyclists of Turkey
Cyclists at the 1928 Summer Olympics
Place of birth missing
20th-century Turkish people